Eurisko (Gr., I discover) is a discovery system written by Douglas Lenat in RLL-1, a representation language itself written in the Lisp programming language. A sequel to Automated Mathematician, it consists of heuristics, i.e. rules of thumb, including heuristics describing how to use and change its own heuristics. Lenat was frustrated by Automated Mathematician's constraint to a single domain and so developed Eurisko; his frustration with the effort of encoding domain knowledge for Eurisko led to Lenat's subsequent (and, continuing) development of Cyc. Lenat envisions ultimately coupling the Cyc knowledgebase with the Eurisko discovery engine.

History 

Development commenced at Carnegie Mellon in 1976 and continued at Stanford University in 1978 when Lenat returned to teach. "For the first five years, nothing good came out of it", Lenat said. But when the implementation was changed to a frame language based representation he called RLL (Representation Language Language), heuristic creation and modification became much simpler. Eurisko was then applied to a number of domains with surprising success, including VLSI chip design.

Lenat and Eurisko gained notoriety by submitting the winning fleet (a large number of stationary, lightly-armored ships with many small weapons) to the United States Traveller TCS national championship in 1981, forcing extensive changes to the game's rules. However, Eurisko won again in 1982 when the program discovered that the rules permitted the program to destroy its own ships, permitting it to continue to use much the same strategy. Tournament officials announced that if Eurisko won another championship the competition would be abolished; Lenat retired Eurisko from the game. The Traveller TCS wins brought Lenat to the attention of DARPA, which has funded much of his subsequent work.

In popular culture
In the first-season The X-Files episode "Ghost in the Machine", Eurisko is the name of a fictional software company responsible for the episode's "monster of the week", facilities management software known as "Central Operating System", or "COS". COS (described in the episode as an "adaptive network") is shown to be capable of learning when its designer arrives at Eurisko headquarters and is surprised to find that COS has given itself the ability to speak. The designer is forced to create a virus to destroy COS after COS commits a series of murders in an apparent effort to prevent its own destruction.

Lenat is mentioned and Eurisko is discussed at the end of Richard Feynman's Computer Heuristics Lecture as part of the Idiosyncratic Thinking Workshop Series.

Lenat and Eurisko are mentioned in the 2019 James Rollins novel Crucible that deals with artificial intelligence and artificial general intelligence.

Notes

References

 
 

Heuristics
Applications of artificial intelligence
Genetic programming